Edward E. Quick (February 16, 1935 – August 27, 2016) was a former American Democratic politician who served in the Missouri Senate as majority leader, minority leader, and Pro Tem, represented Clay County, Missouri, for 20 years. He also served on the Kansas City city council between the mid-1970s and the mid-1980s and as Clay County presiding commissioner for four years until 2010. One of his accomplishments was becoming the first president pro tempore for the Missouri Senate from Kansas City in four decades.

Born in Rich Hill, Missouri, Quick attended school in Higginsville, Missouri. He had worked as a compliance officer for a wood product company and a Kansas City firefighter. Quick died of chronic obstructive pulmonary disease in 2016 at age 81.

References

1935 births
2016 deaths
20th-century American politicians
Democratic Party members of the Missouri House of Representatives
Democratic Party Missouri state senators